Radical 212, 龍, 龙, or 竜 meaning "dragon", is one of the two of the 214  Kangxi radicals that are composed of 16 strokes. The character arose as a stylized drawing of a Chinese dragon, and refers to a version of the dragon in each East Asian culture:
Chinese dragon, Lóng in Chinese
Japanese dragon, Ryū or Tatsu in Japanese
Korean dragon, Ryong or Yong in Korean
Vietnamese dragon, Rồng in Vietnamese

It may also refer to the Dragon as it appears in the Chinese zodiac. It is used as the symbol for Tatsu, a roller coaster at Six Flags Magic Mountain, in California.

In the Kangxi Dictionary 14 characters (out of 40,000) are under this radical.

It occurs as a phonetic complement in some fairly common Chinese characters, for example 聾 = "deaf", which is composed of 龍 "dragon" and the "ear" 耳 radical, "a word with meaning related to ears and pronounced similarly to 龍": "dragon gives sound, ear gives meaning".

Characters with Radical 212

Literature 

Leyi Li: “Tracing the Roots of Chinese Characters: 500 Cases”. Beijing 1993,

References

External links
Unihan Database - U+9F8D

212